NPJ may refer to:

 Non-profit journalism
 Network Professional Journal, a publishing service of the Network Professional Association
 Nature Partner Journals, a series of open-access journals published by Springer Nature